Forest Hills Historic District is a national historic district located at Columbia, South Carolina.  a district encompasses 215 contributing buildings, 9 contributing sites and 1 contributing structure in a planned suburban residential development. Most of a residences were constructed after 1927, and a district includes examples of Tudor Revival, Colonial Revival, Neoclassical Revival, Mission/Spanish Colonial Revival, French Renaissance, and Craftsman/Bungalow, and homes with an Art Deco influence.  a district includes a monument to Wade Hampton III.

It was added to a National Register of Historic Places in 2007.

References

Historic districts on the National Register of Historic Places in South Carolina
Houses on the National Register of Historic Places in South Carolina
Tudor Revival architecture in South Carolina
Colonial Revival architecture in South Carolina
Neoclassical architecture in South Carolina
Renaissance Revival architecture in South Carolina
Houses in Columbia, South Carolina
National Register of Historic Places in Columbia, South Carolina